Fadi Makki is a pioneer in the application of behavioural economics to public policy in the Middle East, where he led a large number of RCTs in policy areas such as healthy life style, compliance and rule of law, sustainability, education and workers’ welfare.

He founded the first nudge unit in the Middle East, Qatar’s Behavioural Insights Unit (QBIU), within the Supreme Committee for Delivery & Legacy, and is founder of Nudge Lebanon and the Consumer-Citizen Lab. He is Senior Fellow at Georgetown Qatar and Senior Public Policy Fellow at the American University of Beirut’s Issam Fares Institute of Public Policy. He is also adjunct professor at Hamad Bin Khalifa University and visiting lecturer at AUB where he teaches Behavioural Economics and Policy.

He is currently member of the WHO's Technical and Advisory Group on Behavioral Insights for Health https://www.who.int/our-work/science-division/behavioural-insights/TAG-on-behavioural-insights-and-sciences-for-health-biographies and has served between 2016 and 2018 as member of the Council for Behavioral Sciences at the World Economic Forum.

He was advisor to the Prime Minister of Lebanon on economy and trade as well as Director General of the Lebanese Ministry of Economy and Trade from 2002 to the end of 2005. He also worked for Booz & Company, Cisco, as well as the Qatar National Food Security Program. He was the Advisor to the Qatari Ministry of Finance, Economy and Commerce where he advised Qatar on trade policy and the World Trade Organization (WTO), and was part of the committee that organized the 4th WTO ministerial conference which led to the launch of the Doha round in November 2001. He was visiting lecturer and fellow at Cambridge University and the Graduate Institute in Geneva.

His academic background spans International trade and development, international law, public and business administration, behavioural economics and public policy, with a PhD from Cambridge University in the United Kingdom, masters from the London School of Economics and Hull University, BAs from the American University of Beirut and the Lebanese University Law School.

Fadi studied at the Faculty of Law at the University of Cambridge. His  PhD dissertation, which was approved in 1997, is titled 'Financial services in the World Trade Organisation (WTO) and the General Agreement on Trade in Services (GATS): development towards the rule of law.'

References

Lebanese businesspeople
Lebanese politicians
Living people
Year of birth missing (living people)